Mei-Chi Shaw (born 1955) is a professor of mathematics at the University of Notre Dame. Her research concerns partial differential equations.

Life and career
Shaw was born in Taipei, Taiwan in 1955. She graduated with an undergraduate degree in mathematics from National Taiwan University in 1977. Shaw received her PhD from Princeton University four years later in 1981, working with Joseph Kohn. She then took a postdoctoral position at Purdue University During this time, she married her husband, Hsueh-Chia Chang. In 1983, Shaw took a tenure-track position at Texas A&M University, moving to University of Houston in 1986 and finally relocating to the University of Notre Dame in 1987, first as an associate professor and then as full professor.

Awards and honors

In 2012, Shaw became a fellow of the American Mathematical Society. For 2019 she received the Stefan Bergman Prize.

Selected publications
Chen, So-Chin; Shaw, Mei-Chi. Partial differential equations in several complex variables. AMS/IP Studies in Advanced Mathematics, 19. American Mathematical Society, Providence, RI; International Press, Boston, MA, 2001. xii+380 pp. 
Shaw, Mei-Chi. L2-estimates and existence theorems for the tangential Cauchy-Riemann complex. Invent. Math. 82 (1985), no. 1, 133–150.
Boas, Harold P.; Shaw, Mei-Chi Sobolev estimates for the Lewy operator on weakly pseudoconvex boundaries. Math. Ann. 274 (1986), no. 2, 221–231.

References

1955 births
Living people
American women mathematicians
20th-century American mathematicians
21st-century American mathematicians
National Taiwan University alumni
Texas A&M University faculty
University of Houston faculty
University of Notre Dame faculty
Fellows of the American Mathematical Society
20th-century Taiwanese mathematicians
Scientists from Taipei
Taiwanese emigrants to the United States
20th-century women mathematicians
21st-century women mathematicians
20th-century American women scientists
21st-century American women scientists